Cadbury Limited is the second largest confectionery company globally after Mars, Incorporated and is a current subsidiary of American company Mondelēz International. Cadbury products are widely distributed and are sold in many countries, the main markets being the United Kingdom and Isle of Man, Ireland, Canada, India, Australia, New Zealand, South Africa and the United States. Some of the following products are made under licence. This list does not include products made by other companies.

Cadbury United Kingdom and Isle of Man

Bars

 Boost
 Boost Duo 
 Boost + Protein 
 Bournville
 Bournville old Jamaica
 Bournville Orange
 Brunch Chocolate Chip
 Brunch Peanut
 Brunch Raisin
 Chomp
 Crunchie
 Curly Wurly
 Dairy Milk
 Dairy Milk 30% Less Sugar
 Dairy Milk Big Taste Choco Biscuit Crunch
 Dairy Milk Big Taste Peanut Caramel Crisp
 Dairy Milk Big Taste Toffee Wholenut
 Dairy Milk Bubbly
 Dairy Milk Caramel
 Dairy Milk Daim
 Dairy Milk Duo
 Dairy Milk Freddo
 Dairy Milk Freddo Caramel
 Dairy Milk Fruit & Nut 
 Dairy Milk Inventor Bars Banoffee Nut Crumble
 Dairy Milk Inventor Bars Fizzing Cherry
 Dairy Milk Inventor Bars No Frowny Brownie
 Dairy Milk Little Bar 
 Dairy Milk Madbury Crunchy Honeycomb
 Dairy Milk Marvellous Creations Jelly Popping Candy
 Dairy Milk Mint Crisp
 Dairy Milk Oreo - also sold under the Milka brand by Mondelez International
 Dairy Milk Whole Nut 
 Darkmilk 
 Darkmilk Crunchy Cocoa Pieces
 Double Decker 
 Double Decker Duo 
 Flake
 Fry's Chocolate Cream
 Fry's Orange Cream
 Fry's Peppermint Cream
 Fry's Raspberry Cream
 Fry's Strawberry Cream (limited Edition)
 Fry's Lemon Turkish Delight (limited Edition)
 Fry's Turkish Delight 
 Fudge
 Mini Rolls Milk Chocolate
 Mini Rolls Raspberry
 Mystery Bar 01 (guess the flavour comp)
 Mystery Bar 02 (guess the flavour comp)
 Peanut Boost + Protein 
 Picnic
 Snack Sandwich
 Snack Shortcake
 Starbar
 Time Out Wafer
 Twirl
 Twirl Orange
 Twirl Caramel (Limited Edition)
 Winter wonderland
 Wispa
 Wispa Duo 
 Wispa Gold
 Wispa Gold Salted Caramel

Blocks 

 Bournville
 Bournville Old Jamaica
 Bournville Orange
 Cadbury White
 Cadbury White Oreo
 Cadbury Caramilk (since 2021)
 Dairy Milk 30% Less Sugar
 Dairy Milk Big Taste Oreo Crunch
 Dairy Milk Big Taste Peanut Caramel Crisp
 Dairy Milk Big Taste Toffee Whole Nut
 Dairy Milk Big Taste Triple Choc Sensation
 Dairy Milk
 Dairy Milk Choca-Latte
 Dairy Milk Chopped Nut
 Dairy Milk Crunchie Bits
 Dairy Milk Daim
 Dairy Milk Fruit & Nut
 Dairy Milk Medley Biscuit and Fudge
 Dairy Milk Oreo
 Dairy Milk Oreo Mint Flavour
 Dairy Milk Oreo Peanut Butter Flavour
 Dairy Milk Tiffin
 Dairy Milk Marvellous Creations Jelly Popping Candy
 Dairy Milk Marvellous Smashables Jelly Popping Candy
 Darkmilk 
 Darkmilk Crunchy Cocoa Pieces  
 Darkmilk Roasted Almond
 Darkmilk Salted Caramel

Bags, Boxes and Rolls 

 Bitsa Wispa
 Boost Bites
 Bournville Giant Buttons
 Cadbury White Freddo Treasures 
 Crunchie Rocks
 Crunchie Treat Size
 Curly Wurly Squirlies
 Dairy Milk Buttons
 Dairy Milk Buttons Treat Size
 Dairy Milk Caramel Nibbles
 Dairy Milk Caramel Nibbles Big Share 
 Dairy Milk Freddo Faces
 Dairy Milk Giant Buttons
 Dairy Milk Giant Buttons Big Share Bag
 Dairy Milk Mini Bars
 Dairy Milk Mixed Buttons 
 Dairy Milk Treat Size
 Darkmilk Giant Buttons
 Dinky Deckers
 Éclairs Classic
 Éclairs Hazelnut Twist
 Éclairs Orange Twist
 Éclairs Velvets
 Favourites
 Freddo Treasures  
 Fudge Minis
 Fudge Treat Size
 Goody Bag
 Heroes
 Heroes Family Bag Treat Size
 Heroes Friends Bag Treat Size
 Heroes Party Bag Treat Size
 Maxi Mix
 Milk Tray
 Mis-Shapes
 Oreo Bites
 Picnic Bites
 Roses 
 Twirl Bites
 Variety 
 White Buttons
 Fudge

Multipacks

 Animals With Freddo 7 
 Boost 4 Pack
 Bournville 4 Pack
 Bournville Brunch Bar Choc Chip 5 Pack
 Brunch Bar Choc Chip 6 Pack
 Brunch Bar Peanut 6 Pack
 Brunch Bar Raisin 6 Pack 
 Cadbury White 4 Pack
 Cadbury White Oreo 4 Pack
 Chomp 6 Pack
 Crunchie 4 Pack
 Crunchie 9 Pack
 Curly Wurly 5 Pack
 Curly Wurly 6 Pack 
 Dairy Milk 3 Pack
 Dairy Milk 4 Pack
 Dairy Milk 9 Pack
 Dairy Milk Buttons 6 Bags
 Dairy Milk Caramel 3 Pack
 Dairy Milk Caramel 4 Pack
 Dairy Milk Caramel 8 Pack
 Dairy Milk Freddo 6 Pack
 Dairy Milk Freddo Caramel 6 Pack
 Dairy Milk Little Bars 6 Pack
 Dairy Milk Oreo 4 Pack
 Darkmilk 4 Pack
 Double Decker 3 Pack
 Double Decker 4 Pack
 Double Decker 9 Pack
 Flake 3 Pack
 Flake 4 Pack
 Flake 9 Pack
 Fudge 6 Pack
 Picnic 3 Pack
 Picnic 4 Pack
 Snack Sandwich 6 Pack
 Snack Sandwich 12 Pack 
 Snack Shortcake 6 Pack
 Time Out Wafer 6 Pack
 Time Out Wafer 7 Pack
 Twirl 3 Pack
 Twirl Twin Bars 4 Pack
 Twirl Twin Bars 7 Pack
 Twirl 11 Pack
 Wispa 4 Pack
 Wispa 9 Pack
 Wispa Gold 4 pack

Beverages

 Bournville Cocoa melted
 Choc Shake (Chocolate Milkshake)
 Freddo Drinking Chocolate
 Drinking Chocolate
 Highlights Bournville
 Highlights Fudge
 Highlights Milk Chocolate
 Hot Chocolate In An Instant
 Wispa Gold Hot Chocolate
 Wispa Hot Chocolate
 Oreo hot chocolate

Cooking
 Bournville Cocoa for Baking
 Chocolate Sprinkler

Easter 

 Caramel Egg
 Caramel Egg 5 Pack
 Creme Egg
 Creme Egg 5 Pack
 Creme Egg 10 Pack
 Creme Egg And Caramel Egg 10 Pack 
 Creme Egg Choc Cakes
 Creme Egg Gift Tin
 Creme Egg Mug 186g
 Creme Egg Mug
 Creme Egg Twisted Bag 83g
 Creme Egg Twisted Bag 94g
 Mini Creme Egg Bag 89g
 Mini Eggs
 Mini Eggs Bar
 Mini Eggs Gift Tin
 Mini Eggs Nest Cakes

Easter Eggs
 Creme Egg Giant Easter Egg 460g
 Creme Egg Large Easter Egg 233g
 Creme Egg Easter Egg 138g
. mini eggs easter egg

Halloween 

 Blackcurrant Bite Mini Rolls
 Crunchy Spiders
 Deadheads
 Screme Egg
 Screme Egg Minis
 Spooky Cake Bars Cinder Toffee
 Spooky Cake Bars Slimy Strawberry 
 Spooky Shapes
 Trick or Treatsize 
 Vampire Mallows

Christmas and Cadbury Gifts Direct Products

 3D Advent Calendar 
 Bournville Heritage Chocolate Selection Box  
 Caramel Bell Tree Decorations 
 Caramel Cakes
 Chocolate Santa
 Chocolate Snowman
 Dairy Milk Advent Calendar
 Dairy Milk And Oreo Selection Box, Box of 8
 Dairy Milk And Oreo Selection Box
 Dairy Milk And Oreo Tree Decorations 14 Pack
 Dairy Milk And Oreo Tree Decorations 14 Pack Box of 10
Dairy Milk Buttons Tube
Dairy Milk Buttons Tube Box of 12
 Dairy Milk Chocolate Tree Decorations 9 Pack
Dairy Milk Christmas Cottage Kit
Dairy Milk Chunks Advent Calendar
 Dairy Milk Chunks Carton
Dairy Milk Chunks Mixed Pouch
Dairy Milk Chunks Secret Santa Large Gift
Dairy Milk Chunks Secret Santa Small Gift
 Dairy Milk Festive Friends Chocolate Biscuits 
Dairy Milk Football Box of 4
 Dairy Milk Freddo & Friends Tub
 Dairy Milk Freddo & Friends Pouch
 Dairy Milk Freddo Faces Tube
Dairy Milk Freddo Faces Tube Box of 12
Dairy Milk Freddo Giant Treasures Chest Tin
 Dairy Milk Freddo Popping Candy
 Dairy Milk Freddo Selection Box
Dairy Milk Freddo Toy & Tin Gift
 Dairy Milk Daim Little Chocolate Robins
Dairy Milk Daim Little Chocolate Robins Box of 16
Dairy Milk Hollow Santa (45g) Box Of 15
Dairy Milk Hollow Santa (100g) Box of 8
Dairy Milk Hollow Santa Gift
Dairy Milk Jingly Bells Chocolate Noisette Bag
Dairy Milk Jingly Bells Chocolate  Noisette Bag Box of 16 
 Dairy Milk Jingly Bells Hazelnut Creme Chocolate Bag 
 Dairy Milk Little Chocolate Robins 
Dairy Milk Little Chocolate Robins Box of 16 
Dairy Milk Merry Christmas Bar With Sleeve 
Dairy Milk Mini Hollow Chocolate Santas (5 Pack) 
Dairy Milk Mini Hollow Chocolate Santas (5 Pack) Box of 9  
 Dairy Milk Mousse Snowman Chocolate 
Dairy Milk Mousse Snowman Chocolate Box of 33 
Dairy Milk Mousse Snowman Orange 
Dairy Milk Mousse Snowman Orange Box of 33 
 Dairy Milk Mousse Snowman Vanilla
Dairy Milk On The Nice List Gift Bar
Dairy Milk Vintage Bar
Dairy Milk Winter Gingerbread
Dairy Milk Winter Gingerbread Box of 17
 Dairy Milk Winter Wonderland 
Darkmilk Selection Box 
Darkmilk Selection Box, Box of 8 
Double Deck Selection Box 
 Endless Wispa
 Festive Friends
 Festive Selection
Fry's Selection Box 
Giant Selection Box
Giant Selection Box Twin Pack
 Heroes Advent Calendar
 Heroes Carton
Heroes Pouch
Heroes Limited Edition Tin 
 Heroes Tin Games Edition
Heroes Tub 
 Large Chocolate Hollow Santa
 Limited Edition Snowy Fingers
 Little Wishes
 Magical Advent Calendar
 Mallows with Caramel
Merry Christmas Dairy Milk Gift Bar
 Mini Snowballs 
 Mini Yule Logs
 Mint Mini Rolls
 Occasions
 Reindeer Cakes
 Dairy Milk Heritage Collection Retro Selection Box
 Puds
 Puds Box of 48
 Roses Carton
 Santa Selection Box
Santa's Sleigh Kit
Secret Santa Dairy Milk Bar
Selection Box
Selection Box, Box of 8
 Small Chocolate Selection Pack
Small Chocolate Selection Pack Box of 24
 Stocking Selection Box
Stocking Selection Box's (2 Pack)
Stocking Selection Box, Box of 8
 Snowbites
 White Advent Calendar
 White Chocolate Flavour Cake Bars
 Winter Gingerbread Cake Bars

Desserts

 Amaze Bites Chocolate Orange
 Amaze Bites Double Chocolate 
 Boost Cake Bars
 Bubbles of Joy
 Caramel Cake Bars 
 Caramel Choc Tarts
 Caramel Doughnuts 
 Caramel Muffins
 Caramel Share the Joy Cake
 Chocolate Doughnuts
 Chocolate Eclairs
 Chocolate Fresh Cream Cake
 Chocolate Muffins
 Crunchie Friday Feeling Cake 
 Crunchie Choc Tarts
 Cupcakes with Crunchie
 Cupcakes with Flake
 Dairy Milk Big Taste Triple Choc Sensation Twin Pot
 Dairy Milk Buttons Celebration Cake
 Dairy Milk Buttons Twin Pot
 Dairy Milk Chunks Twin Pot
 Dairy Milk Daim Twin Pot
 Desserts Hazelnut Flavour 
 Desserts Milk Chocolate
 Desserts Salted Caramel Flavour
 Desserts with Fudge Pieces
 Desserts with Orange Zingers
 Desserts with Toffee Clusters
 Flake Celebration Cake 
 Flake Choc Tarts
 Flake Fresh Cream Cake
 Flake Twin Pot
 Fudge Sticky Puds
 Fudge Twin Pot
 Heroes Party Cupcakes
 Hot Caramel Pudding
 Hot Chocolate Pudding
 Layers of Joy Chocolate Trifle 
 Milk Chocolate Cake Bars
 Milk Chocolate Sticky Puds
 Pots of Joy Dairy Milk
 Pots of Joy Dairy Milk Caramel
 Pots of Joy White Chocolate Buttons
 Swiss Gateau Chocolate
 Triple Choc Roll

Ice Cream

 Boost Stick
 Creme Egg Stick
 Creme Egg Cone
 Creme Egg Tub
 Dream Stick
 Flake 99 Cone
 Flake 99 Strawberry Cone
 Crunchie Blast Stick
 Crunchie Tub
 Dairy Milk Big Toffee Whole Nut Tub
 Dairy Milk Buttons Cone
 Dairy Milk Caramel Cone
 Dairy Milk Caramel Stick
 Dairy Milk Caramel Tub
 Dairy Milk Marvellous Ice Creams Jelly Popping Candy Stick
 Dairy Milk Medley Stick
 Dairy Milk Mini Cones
 Dairy Milk Minis & Caramel Minis
 Dairy Milk Stick
 Dairy Milk Tub
 Double Decker Tub
 Flake Tub
 Freddo Sandwich

Biscuits

 Animals
 Break Bar Choco Melting Middle
 Break Bar Melting Middle
 Cadbury Coated Oreo Biscuits
 Caramel Biscuits
 Chocolate Chip Brownie 
 Chocolate Chunk Cookies 
 Chocolicious (biscuits covered in Cadbury milk chocolate)  
 Cookies Choc Chip
 Crunchie Biscuits 
 Crunchy Melts Chocolate Centre
 Crunchy Melts Double Indulgence
 Crunchy Melts Oreo Creme
 Crunchy Melts Soft Cookie Center
 Dairy Milk Biscuits 
 Dinos
 Double Chocolate Delight Sandwich 
 Fabulous Fingers
 Fingers
 Fingers White Chocolate 
 Freddo Biscuits 
 Freddo Face Cakes
 Hazelnut Chunk Brownie
 Mello's 
 Mello's Caramel
 Mini Fingers 
 Mini Fingers Snack Pack
 Mini Stars
 Nibbly Fingers Bag
 Nibbly Fingers Pouch
 Roundie Caramel
 Roundie Dark Chocolate
 Roundie Milk Chocolate
 Roundie White Chocolate 
 Shorties
 Signature 
 Snack 
 Wheaties
 Wispa Biscuits

Travel Exclusives

 Bubbly Caramel 
 Crunchie Chunks Pouch
 Dairy Milk Caramel Chunks Bag
 Dairy Milk Caramel Chunks Pouch
 Dairy Milk Chunks Bag
 Dairy Milk Chunks Pouch
 Dairy Milk Fruit & Nut Chunks Pouch
 Dairy Milk Whole Nut Chunks Bag
 Dairy Milk Whole Nut Chunks Pouch
 Éclairs Chunks Pouch
 Flake Gift Box
 Flake Miniature Bag
 Flake a Present Box
 Luxury Selection Praline Sharing Box
 Travel Mix

Spreads

 Caramel Spread
 Crunchie Spread
 Double Decker Spread
 Milk Chocolate Spread

Cadbury United Kingdom and Isle of Man discontinued products

Bars and Blocks

 Almond
 Almond Carbohydrate Modified Chocolate
 Almond Dessert Chocolate
 Amazin' Raisin
 Apple Jack
 Apricot & Almond
 Assorted Nut
 Autumn Nuts
 Aztec
 Aztec 2000
 Batman Bar
 Bar Noir
 Bar Six
 Big One
 Bitter Chocolate
 Black Forest
 Blended Chocolate
 Bonus
 Boost Coconut
 Boost Peanut
 Boost with Guarana
 Border Creme
 Bournville Dark
 Bournville Deeply Dark
 Bournville Deeply Dark Coffee
 Bournville Family Bar
 Bournville King Size
 Bournville Mint Crisp
 Bournville Roasted Almond
 Brazil Nut
 Brazil Nuts Family Bar
 Breakaway
 Brunch Cranberry & Orange
 Brunch Hazelnut
 Bugs Bunny Wispa
 Butterscotch Brittle
 California Dreaming
 Cappuccino
 Caramello
 Caramel Double Chocolate Dream
 Caramel Dark Chocolate Mint
 Caramel King Size
 Caramel Mint
 Caramel Pocket Pack
 Caramilk
 Cheesy Criss Cross
 Cherries and Hazelnuts
 Chocolate Creme Sandwich
 Chocolate Fudge
 Chocolate Lollipop Wenlock and Mandeville Mascots
 Chocolate Mascots
 Cookies & Cream
 Country Style
 Craze
 Creme Egg Twisted
 Crispello Double Choc
 Crispello Vanilla Velvet
 Crispy Byte
 Coffee Break
 Coffee Creme
 Coffee Dessert
 Coffee & Truffle Milk Block
 Coffee & Walnut
 Crunchie Blast
 Crunchie Bubbly
 Crunchie Explosion
 Crunchie King Size
 Crunchie Lemonade
 Crunchie Mint
 Crunchie Orange
 Crunchie Tango
 Curly Wurly Cool Orange
 Dairy Milk Apricot Crumble Crunch
 Dairy Milk Bar & a Half
 Dairy Milk Bar of Plenty Berry Fruit & Vanilla Shortcake
 Dairy Milk Bar of Plenty Honey Flakes & Caramelised Pecans
 Dairy Milk Bar of Plenty Roast Hazelnut & Honey Roast Cashews
 Dairy Milk Bar of Plenty Toffee Apple
 Dairy Milk Bliss
 Dairy Milk Bliss Dreamy Chocolate Truffle
 Dairy Milk Bliss Irresistible Hazelnut Truffle
 Dairy Milk Bliss Scrumptious Toffee Flavour Truffle
 Dairy Milk Bronzed Creme Crunch
 Dairy Milk Bubbly Mini
 Dairy Milk Chips Ahoy
 Dairy Milk Chunky
 Dairy Milk Cranberry and Granola
 Dairy Milk Crispies
 Dairy Milk Divided Bar
 Dairy Milk Double Choc
 Dairy Milk Family Bar
 Dairy Milk Fruit & Nut Bar & a Half
 Dairy Milk Golden Biscuit Crunch
 Dairy Milk Hoppy Bunny
 Dairy Milk King Size
 Dairy Milk Lu
 Dairy Milk Madbury Choco-Latte
 Dairy Milk Madbury Coconutty 
 Dairy Milk Madbury Out of The Blueberry
 Dairy Milk Madbury Raspberry Shortcake
 Dairy Milk Madbury Simply The Zest
 Dairy Milk Magical Elves
 Dairy Milk Marvellous Creations Banana Caramel Crisp
 Dairy Milk Marvellous Creations Cola Prezel Honeycomb
 Dairy Milk Marvellous Creations Cookie Nut Crunch
 Dairy Milk Marvellous Creations Rocky Mallow Road
 Dairy Milk Marvellous Smashables Jelly Popping Candy
 Dairy Milk Marvellous Smashables Rocky Mallow Road
 Dairy Milk Medley Dark Chocolate, Hazelnuts and Raspberry Pieces 
 Dairy Milk Miniatures
 Dairy Milk Mint Chips
 Dairy Milk Nuts for Gold
 Dairy Milk Nutty Caramel
 Dairy Milk Oat Crunch
 Dairy Milk Orange
 Dairy Milk Orange Chips
 Dairy Milk Pocket Pack
 Dairy Milk Puddles Smooth Hazelnut
 Dairy Milk Puddles Smooth Mint
 Dairy Milk Quick
 Dairy Milk Ritz
 Dairy Milk Shortcake Biscuit
 Dairy Milk Silvery Creme
 Dairy Milk Snowy Delight
 Dairy Milk Strawberries & Creme
 Dairy Milk Toffee Popcorn
 Dairy Milk Turkish (though it is only available in the UK in Dunnes Stores and Appy Shop)
 Dairy Milk Wafer
 Dairy Milk Whole Nut Bar & a Half
 Dairy Milk 8 Chunk
 Double Fudge Dream
 Dream (relaunched 2020 only at B&M)
 Dream Little Bars
 Dream with Real Strawberries
 Extra
 Fine Dessert Chocolate
 Flake Allure
 Flake Dark
 Flake Dipped
 Flake Plain
 Flake Praline
 Flake Snow
 Fruit Chunky
 Fruit Flavoured Filled Block
 Fruit Sundae
 Fruit & Nut Blended Chocolate
 Fruit & Nut Bournville
 Fruit & Nut Family Bar
 Fruit & Nut King Size
 Fruit & Nut Pocket Pack
 Fruit & Nut Vending Bar
 Fuse - Sold in India by Mondelez
 Fuse King Size
 Gambit
 Ginger
 Ginger Biscuit
 Go
 Golden Crisp
 Gold Mine
 Grand Seville
 Hazel
 Highlights
 Ice Breaker
 Laughs
 Lemon
 Lime
 Lime Tray Block
 Lunch Chocolate
 Mandarin
 Marble
 Marshmallow
 Marzipan Milk Block
 Marzipan Walnut
 Mild Dessert Chocolate
 Milk Almond Nougat
 Milk Coffee Creme Stick
 Milk Creme Strawberry
 Milk Marshmallow
 Milk Tray Block
 Mint Crisp
 Monster Bar
 Nobble
 Noisette
 Nunch
 Nut Crisp
 Nuts About Caramel
 Nuts About Caramel Double Chocolate
 Old Jamaica
 Orange Creme
 Oranges & Lemons
 Peanut Sub
 Peppermint
 Peppermint Pattie
 Pineapple
 Plain Choice
 Plain Diabetic Chocolate
 Plain Six
 Puds Minis
 Raspberry
 Ration Chocolate
 Roasted Almond
 Roobarb Bar
 Royal Mint
 Ruffle
 Rumba
 Sandwich Plain Chocolate
 Shush
 Silk
 Skippy
 Sliced Nut
 Smiley
 Smooth Mint Creme
 Snack Raisin Cereal Bar
 Snack Wafer
 Soccerbar
 Special Recipe
 Spectacular 7
 Spice Girls
 Spira
 Spots V Stripes Challenge Bar
 Spots V Stripes The Big Race
 Star Wars Episode I
 Strawberry
 Strawberry Creme
 Strawberry Tray Block
 Summer Fruits
 Sunfruits Blackcurrant
 Supermousse
 Swiss Chalet
 Tangerine
 Taz
 The Shoe People
 The Wombles
 Three Wishes
 Ticket
 Time Out
 Time Out Chunky
 Time Out Mint Chunky
 Time Out Orange
 Toffee Tray Block
 Top Deck (relaunched 2020 only at B&M)
 Touch Down
 Tropical Fruits
 Truffle Orange Liqueur Flavour
 Truffle Rum Flavour
 Vanilla & Cream
 Velvet Blend
 Velvet Mint
 Wacky Races
 Walnut
 Welcome
 Westlife
 Whipped Creme Caramel
 Whipped Creme Walnut
 Whistler
 White Christmas
 Whole Fruit
 Whole Hazels
 Whole Nut Blended Chocolate
 Whole Nut Chunky
 Whole Nut Family Bar
 Wildlife
 Wishes
 Wispa Bite
 Wispaccino
 Wispa Mint
 Wispa Orange
 Zousse
 1848 Blanc Vanille

Bags, Boxes and Rolls

 Allora
 Amethyst Assortment
 Animal Playmates
 Animals Bites
 Astros
 Biarritz Assortment of Dark Chocolates 
 Bizarre
 Bond Street
 Border Creme Eggs
 Bournville Selection
 Choc’ Full of Clusters
 Choc’ Full of Peanuts
 Choc’ Full of Raisins
 Chocolate Dainty Creams
 Chocolate Éclairs Roll
 Crispello Double Choc
 Crispello Vanilla Velvet
 Crunchie Nuggets
 Crunchums
 Contrast
 Dairy Milk Chocos
 Dairy Milk Melts Deliciously Dark
 Dairy Milk Melts Heavenly Praline
 Dairy Milk Melts Velvety Milk
 Dairy Milk Mix-Ups with Maynard's
 Dairy Milk Mix-Ups with Oreo
 Dairy Milk Pebbles
 Dairy Milk Tasters
 Dairy Milk Variety
 Darkness Chocolates
 Éclairs Velvet Coffee Flavour
 Fruit & Nut Tasters
 Gems
 Hazel Whirls
 Inspirations Chocolates
 King Edward Chocolates
 King George V Chocolates
 Koko Milk Chocolate Truffles
 Koko Truffle Collection
 Lucky Numbers
 Mayfair Chocolates
 Milk Chocolate Caramels
 Miniature Heroes
 Nuts Chocolates
 Popcorn
 Pretzels
 Princess Chocolates
 Roses Caramel Barrel
 Roses Strawberry Dream
 Shots
 Snack Shots
 Snaps Caramel Crunch
 Snaps Hazelnut
 Snaps Milk Chocolate
 Snaps Mint
 Snaps Orange
 Something Special Chocolates
 Spice Collection
 Strawberry Buttons
 Strollers
 Stuart Chocolates
 Thank You Pralines
 Toffee Buttons
 Tops Assorted Fruits
 Tops Liquorice
 Tops Mint
 Tribute
 Trillions
 Twenties
 Vogue
 With Love Pralines
 Whole Nut Tasters

Beverages

 Bournvita
 Breakfast Cocoa
 Chocolate Break
 Chocolate Milk
 Cocoa Essence
 Cream Liqueur
 Cup Chocolate
 Dietetic Cocoa
 Double Strength Red Label Drinking Chocolate
 Fine Brew Instant Tea
 Gem Chocolate Powder
 Highlights Caramel
 Highlights Chocolate Mocha
 Highlights Dark Chocolate
 Highlights Hazelnut
 Highlights Mint
 Highlights Orange
 Hot Choc Chunks
 Instant Break
 Marvel
 Pearl Cocoa
 Suprema
 Top Choc Vending

Desserts

 Almond Slices
 Appletree Dried Apple Flavour
 Appletree Bilberry and Dried Apple Flavour
 Appletree Lemon and Dried Apple Flavour
 Appletree Orange and Dried Apple Flavour
 Apple Twins
 Apricot Pie
 Assorted Tarts
 Banana Mini Rolls
 Brazilian Gateau
 Butter Sponge Lemon
 Butter Sponge Vanillia
 Cola Mini Rolls
 Dairy Milk Caramel Nibbles Twin Pot
 Dairy Milk Crunchie Twin Pot
 Dairy Milk Freddo Faces Twin Pot
 Dairy Milk Marvellous Mix-Ups Banana Sour Fudge Twin Pot
 Dairy Milk Marvellous Mix-Ups Cherry Cola Fizz Twin Pot
 Dairy Milk Marvellous Mix-Ups Fruity Jelly Popping Candy Twin Pot
 Dairy Milk Mint Chips Twin Pot
 Dairy Milk Pebbles Twin Pot
 Dairy Milk Shortcake Biscuit Twin Pot
 Double Chocolate Mini Rolls
 Caramel Cake Bites
 Caramel Mini Rolls
 Caramel Mousse
 Caramel Trifle
 Cherry & Vanilla Mini Rolls
 Cherry Iced Gateau
 Chillo
 Choc Chip Cake Bites
 Chocolate Chaos Pot
 Chocolate Cheesecake Flake
 Chocolate House Cake
 Chocolate House Fancies
 Chocolate Orange Mini Rolls
 Clusters Twin Pot
 Coffee Gateau
 Custard Dessert Mix with Caramel Topping
 Delights
 Fresca
 Fruit & Nut Cake Bars
 Fudge Cake Bars
 Fudge Cake Bites
 Fudge Diamonds
 Gooseberry Pie
 Hazelnut Mini Rolls
 Highlights Cake Bars Toffee
 Hot Cakes Butterscotch
 Hot Cakes Double Choc
 Hot Caramel Pudding
 Hot Chocolate Orange Pudding
 Hot Chocolate Pudding
 Ice Caps Lemon
 Ice Caps Raspberry
 Iced Coffee Gateau
 Iced Gateau
 Layers of Joy Black Forest
 Layers of Joy Caramellionaire
 Lemon Iced Gateau
 Lemon Meringue Pie
 Lemon Ring
 Light Mousse
 Light Trifle
 Milk Chocolate Jaffa Cake Bars
 Milk Chocolate Mint Cake Bars
 Mini Bakes Chocolate Brownie
 Mini Mini Rolls
 Mini-Sponges Coffee
 Mini-Sponges Raspberry & Vanillia
 Mint Choc Flavour Mini Rolls
 Mint Mousse
 Orange Mousse
 Raspberry Ripple Flavour Mini Rolls
 Rich Genoa Cake
 Ring Ding Swiss Roll Slice
 Roses Coffee Escape Cake Bars
 Roses Orange Creme Cake Bars
 Roses Pots of Joy Coffee Escape
 Roses Pots of Joy Hazelnut Whirl
 Roses Pots of Joy Strawberry Dream
 Roses Strawberry Dream Cake Bars
 Sandwich with Vanillia Filling
 Smart Pots Light
 Smart Pots Milk Chocolate
 Smart Pots Mint
 Sponge Roll with Apricot & Vanillia Fillings
 Strawberry Mini Rolls
 Strawberry & Blueberry Mini Rolls
 Swiss Dessert Chocolate Flavour
 Swiss Dessert Vanilla Flavour
 Swiss Roll with Raspberry Flavour Filling
 Toffee Ripple Flavour Mini Rolls
 Triple Choc Crisp Cake Bites
 Turkish Cake Bars

Cooking

 Buttons Minis Muffins Mix
 Chocolate Brownies
 Heavenly Chocolate Cake
 Milk Chocolate Chunk Brownie Mix
 Milk Chocolate Cookies
 White Chocolate Buttons Cake Mix

Biscuits

 Angel Creams
 Animal Bites
 Big Crunch Milk Chocolate
 Big Crunch Plain Chocolate
 BiscBits Caramel Crisp
 BiscBits Chocolate Crisp
 BiscBits Honeycomb Crunch
 BiscBits Mint Crunch
 BiscBits Orange Crisp
 BiscBits Rocky Road Crunch
 Bournville Biscuits
 Brownie
 Brunch Bakes Apple & Sultana
 Brunch Bakes Fruit & Nut
 Brunch Breaks Granola, Hazelnut & Raisin
 Brunch Breaks Sunflower Seeds, Hazelnuts & Raisins
 Brunch Munch Oat & Apricot
 Brunch Munch Oat & Honey
 Butter Shorties
 Caprice
 Chocolate Flapjack
 Chocolate Sandwich Chocolate Biscuits
 Chocolate Wafers
 Choc Brownie Flavour
 Choc Rings
 Cookies Chunky Choc & Fruit
 Cookies Chunky Milk, Dark & White Choc
 Dark Chocolate Mint Fingers
 Double Choc Cookies
 Elizabethan Wafers Milk Chocolate
 Elizabethan Wafers Plain Chocolate
 Fingers Bournville
 Fingers Caramel
 Fingers Dark Chocolate Mint
 Fingers Double Chocolate
 Fingers Salted Caramel Crunch
 Fingers Salted Peanut Crunch
 Fingers Toffee Crunch
 Fruit & Nut Flapjack
 Giant Fingers
 Gingermen
 Half Covered Cokernut Milk Chocolate Biscuits
Half Covered Milk Chocolate Rich T's
 Highlights Chocolate Cookie Crunch
 Highlights Chocolate Nibbles
 Highlights Honeycomb Nibbles
 Highlights Orange Cookie Crunch
 High Tea
 Holiday
 Home Grain
 Honeycomb Fabulous Fingers
 Jestives
 Jestives Choc Chip
 Jumbo Animals
 Lime Creams
 Little Monsters
 Midler
 Milk Assorted
 Milk Finger
 Milk Wafer
 Mini Fingers Honeycomb
 Mini Fingers Mint
 Mini Fingers Toffee Crunch
 Oat & Choc Chip
 Orange Creams
 Orange Sandwich Chocolate Biscuits
 Pickwick Biscuits
 Polar Bears
 Praline Fabulous Fingers
 Raspberry Wafer
 Table Biscuits
 Turkish Biscuits
 White Chocolate Bears

Miscellaneous

 Chocolate Coins
 Christmas Pudding
 Decimal Coins Milk Chocolate
 Milk Chocolate Hazelnut Spread
 Tiny Size Chiclets Fruit Flavor
 Mince Pies
 Smash
 Stackers

Cadbury Ireland

Bars and Blocks

 Bournville
 Brunch Chocolate Chip
 Brunch Peanut
 Brunch Raisin
 Caramilk
 Chomp
 Crunchie
 Curly Wurly
 Dairy Milk
 Dairy Milk Big Taste Caramel Peanut Crisp
 Dairy Milk Big Taste Choco Biscuit Crunch
 Dairy Milk Big Taste Oreo Crunch
 Dairy Milk Big Taste Toffee Whole Nut
 Dairy Milk Big Taste Triple Choc Sensation
 Dairy Milk Bubbly
 Dairy Milk Caramel
 Dairy Milk Daim
 Dairy Milk Duo
 Dairy Milk Freddo 
 Dairy Milk Freddo Caramel
 Dairy Milk Fruit & Nut
 Dairy Milk Fruit & Nut Chopped
 Dairy Milk Little Bar 
 Dairy Milk Marvellous Creations Jelly Popping Candy
 Dairy Milk Marvellous Smashables Jelly Popping Candy
 Dairy Milk Medley Dark Chocolate, Biscuit and Fudge
 Dairy Milk Medley Dark Chocolate, Hazelnuts and Raspberry Pieces
 Dairy Milk Oreo
 Dairy Milk Oreo Mint Flavour
 Dairy Milk Oreo Peanut Butter Flavour
 Dairy Milk Tiffin
 Dairy Milk Whole Nut 
 Dairy Milk Whole Nut Chopped
 Dairy Milk with Crunchie Bits 
 Double Decker
 Double Decker Duo 
 Flake
 Fudge
 Moro
 Moro Duo
 Picnic
 Snack Sandwich
 Snack Shortcake
 Starbar
 Time Out Wafer
 Twirl
 Wispa
 Wispa Duo 
 Wispa Gold

Bags, Boxes and Rolls

 Bitsa Wispa
 Boost Bites
 Crunchie Rocks
 Crunchie Treat Size
 Curly Wurly Squirlies
 Dairy Milk Buttons
 Dairy Milk Buttons Treat Size
 Dairy Milk Caramel Nibbles
 Dairy Milk Caramel Nibbles Big Share Bag
 Dairy Milk Freddo Faces
 Dairy Milk Giant Buttons
 Dairy Milk Giant Buttons Big Share Bag
 Diry Milk Buttons Mixed
 Dairy Milk Treat Size
 Dinky Deckers
 Éclairs Classic
 Éclairs Hazelnut Twist
 Éclairs Orange Twist
 Éclairs Velvets
 Favourites 
 Fudge Minis
 Goody Bag
 Heroes
 Heroes Family Bag Treat Size
 Heroes Friends Bag Treat Size
 Heroes Party Bag Treat Size
 Maxi Mix
 Milk Tray
 Mis-Shapes
 Picnic Bites
 Roses 
 Twirl Bites
 Variety 
 White Buttons

Beverages

 Bournville Cocoa
 Freddo Drinking Chocolate
 Drinking Chocolate
 Highlights Bournville
 Highlights Fudge
 Highlights Milk Chocolate
 Hot Chocolate In An Instant
 Wispa Gold Hot Chocolate
 Wispa Hot Chocolate

Cooking

 Bournville Cocoa for Baking
 Chocolate Sprinkler

Desserts

 Amaze Bites Chocolate Orange
 Amaze Bites Double Chocolate 
 Boost Cake Bars
 Bubbles of Joy
 Caramel Cake Bars 
 Caramel Choc Tarts
 Caramel Doughnuts 
 Caramel Muffins
 Caramel Share the Joy Cake
 Chocolate Doughnuts
 Chocolate Eclairs
 Chocolate Fresh Cream Cake
 Chocolate Muffins
 Crunchie Friday Feeling Cake 
 Crunchie Choc Tarts
 Cupcakes with Crunchie
 Cupcakes with Flake
 Dairy Milk Big Taste Triple Choc Sensation Twin Pot
 Dairy Milk Buttons Celebration Cake
 Dairy Milk Buttons Twin Pot
 Dairy Milk Chunks Twin Pot
 Dairy Milk Daim Twin Pot
 Desserts Hazelnut Flavour 
 Desserts Milk Chocolate
 Desserts Salted Caramel Flavour
 Desserts with Fudge Pieces
 Desserts with Orange Zingers
 Desserts with Toffee Clusters
 Flake Celebration Cake 
 Flake Choc Tarts
 Flake Fresh Cream Cake
 Flake Twin Pot
 Fudge Sticky Puds
 Fudge Twin Pot
 Heroes Party Cupcakes
 Hot Caramel Pudding
 Hot Chocolate Pudding
 Layers of Joy Chocolate Trifle 
 Milk Chocolate Cake Bars
 Milk Chocolate Sticky Puds
 Mini Rolls Mega Roll Raspberry
 Mini Rolls Milk Chocolate
 Mini Rolls Raspberry
 Mini Rolls Variety Pack
 Pots of Joy Dairy Milk
 Pots of Joy Dairy Milk Caramel
 Pots of Joy White Chocolate Buttons
 Swiss Gateau Chocolate
 Triple Choc Roll

Ice Cream

 Crunchie Blast Stick
 Dream Stick
 Flake 99 Cone
 Flake 99 Strawberry Cone
 Crunchie Blast Stick
 Crunchie Tub
 Dairy Milk Big Toffee Whole Nut Tub
 Dairy Milk Buttons Cone
 Dairy Milk Caramel Cone
 Dairy Milk Caramel Stick
 Dairy Milk Caramel Tub
 Dairy Milk Marvellous Ice Creams Jelly Popping Candy Stick
 Dairy Milk Medley Stick
 Dairy Milk Mini Cones
 Dairy Milk Minis & Caramel Minis
 Dairy Milk Stick
 Flake Tub

Biscuits

 Animals
 Break Bar Choco Melting Middle
 Break Bar Melting Middle
 Caramel Biscuits
 Chocolate Chunk Cookies 
 Cookies Choc Chip
 Crunchie Biscuits 
 Crunchy Melts Chocolate Centre
 Crunchy Melts Soft Cookie Center
 Dairy Milk Biscuits 
 Dinos
 Fabulous Fingers
 Fingers
 Fingers White Chocolate 
 Freddo Biscuits 
 Freddo Face Cakes
 Mello's 
 Mello's Caramel
 Mini Fingers 
 Mini Fingers Snack Pack
 Mini Stars
 Rich T's
 Roundie Caramel
 Roundie Dark Chocolate
 Roundie Milk Chocolate 
 Shorties
 Signature 
 Wheaties

Spreads

 Caramel Spread
 Crunchie Spread
 Double Decker Spread
 Milk Chocolate Spread

Cadbury South Africa

Bars and Blocks

 5 Star
 Bournville Classic Dark Chocolate
 Bournville Classic Dark Chocolate with Mint Essence
 Chomp
 Chomp Strips
 Crunchie
 Dairy Milk 
 Dairy Milk Biscuit 
 Dairy Milk Bubbly
 Dairy Milk Bubbly Mint Chocolate
 Dairy Milk Bubbly Oreo
 Dairy Milk Bubbly Top Deck
 Dairy Milk Caramello
 Dairy Milk Caramello Bear
 Dairy Milk Cashew & Coconut 
 Dairy Milk Fruit & Nut
 Dairy Milk Marvellous Creations Jelly Popping Candy
 Dairy Milk Mint Crisp
 Dairy Milk Oreo
 Dairy Milk Rum & Raisin Flavour
 Dairy Milk Top Deck
 Dairy Milk Top Deck Mint
 Dairy Milk Whole Nut 
 Dream
 Dream with Biscuit
 Lunch Bar
 Lunch Bar Dream
 Lunch Bar Man Size
 P.S Caramilk
 P.S Caramilk Mini
 P.S Milk Chocolate
 P.S Milk Chocolate Mini
 Snacker Fruit
 Snacker Original

Bags and Boxes

 Astros
 Chomp Treat Size Party Pack
 Dairy Milk Bite-size Treat Bag
 Dairy Milk Top Deck Bite-size Treat Bag
 Dairy Milk Whispers
 Dream Bite-size
 Éclairs
 Éclairs Pops
 Glow
 Lunch Bar Bite-size
 Milk Tray
 P.S. Éclairs
 P.S. Éclairs Pops
 Tumbles Raisins 
 Tumbles Shortcake

Beverages

 Bournville Cocoa
 Hot Chocolate
 Hot Chocolate Highlights

Cadbury South Africa Discontinued Products

Bars and Blocks

 Bournville Classic Dark Chocolate with Caramel Crisp 
 Bournville Classic Dark Chocolate with Mint Essence
 Bournville Classic Dark Chocolate with Roasted Almonds
 Bournville Classic Dark Chocolate with Orange Essence
 Bigger Chomp
 Bonton Cappuccino
 Bonton Mint
 Brazil Nut
 Candy Nut
 Centerfold
 Cherry Chomp
 Chunky Fruit & Nut
 Chunky Golden Crisp
 Chunky Snack
 Dairy Milk Chocolate Brownie 
 Dairy Milk Coconut Ice
 Dairy Milk Coffee & Condensed Milk
 Dairy Milk Crème Caramel
 Dairy Milk Marula & Ice Cream
 Dairy Milk Marvellous Creations Cookie Gummy Crunch
 Dairy Milk Mint Crisp Fridge Tart
 Dairy Milk Mousse
 Dairy Milk Question
 Dairy Milk Traditional Milk Tart
 Dairy Milk Turkish
 Dream with Almond and Coconut 
 Flake Dipped
 Fruit 
 Fruit Fare
 Honey Crisp
 Liquid Centres Caramel 
 Liquid Centres Condensed Milk
 Liquid Centres Peppermint
 Lunch Bar Triple Choc
 Sevens 
 Snacker Yoghurt
 Snowflake
 Special Selection Apricots in Brandy
 Special Selection Ginger Pieces
 Special Selection Pineapple and Almonds
 Sweetie Pie
 Tempo
 Tempo Power-Nut
 Three Wishes Caramilk Centre
 Walnut

Cadbury Australia

Bars and Blocks 

 Boost
 Boost Twin Pack
 Caramello Koala
 Cherry Ripe
 Cherry Ripe Twin Pack
 Coco 70% Cocoa Dark
 Coco 70% Cocoa Dark Mint
 Coco 70% Cocoa Dark Orange
 Crunchie
 Crunchie Twin Pack
 Curly Wurly
 Dairy Milk
 Dairy Milk Marble
 Dairy Milk Black Forest
 Dairy Milk Bubbly Honeycomb
 Dairy Milk Bubbly Milk Chocolate 
 Dairy Milk Bubbly Milk Chocolate Mini
 Dairy Milk Bubbly Mint
 Dairy Milk Bubbly Mint Mini
 Dairy Milk Caramello
 Dairy Milk Coconut Rough
 Dairy Milk Crunchy Crackers
 Dairy Milk Freddo Block
 Dairy Milk Freddo with Sprinkles Block
 Dairy Milk Fruit & Nut
 Dairy Milk Hazelnut
 Dairy Milk Marvellous Creations Clinkers Raspberry Chips Marshmallows  
 Dairy Milk Marvellous Creations Jelly Crunchie Bits
 Dairy Milk Marvellous Creations Jelly Popping Candy Beanies 
 Dairy Milk Marvellous Creations Spider Choc Orange 
 Dairy Milk Marvellous Creations Spider Choc Lemonade
 Dairy Milk Marvellous Creations Spider Choc Raspberry
 Dairy Milk Oreo
 Dairy Milk Oreo Double Choc
 Dairy Milk Oreo Mint
 Dairy Milk Oreo Strawberry
 Dairy Milk Peppermint
 Dairy Milk Roast Almond
 Dairy Milk Rocky Road
 Dairy Milk Salted Caramel
 Dairy Milk Snack
 Dairy Milk Top Deck
 Dairy Milk Turkish Delight
 Dairy Milk with Crunchie
 Dark Milk Crunchy Salted Caramel
 Dark Milk Roasted & Caramelised Hazelnuts
 Dark Milk Sweet Zingy Raspberry 
 Dream
 Flake
 Freddo Milky Top
 Freddo Peppermint Lilypad
 Freddo Peppermint Lilypad Twin Pack
 Freddo Popping Candy 
 Freddo Raspberry Rocks
 Freddo Strawberry Pond
 Freddo Strawberry Pond Twin Pack
 Freddo White Chocolate
 Furry Friends
 Giant Caramello Koala 
 Old Gold 70% Cocoa
 Old Gold Old Jamaica
 Old Gold Original
 Old Gold Peppermint
 Old Gold Roast Almond
 Picnic
 Picnic Twin Pack
 Time Out
 Time Out Twin Pack
 Twirl
 Twirl Triple Pack
 Wobbly

Bags and Boxes

 Boost Sharepack
 Caramello Koala Sharepack
 Caramels 
 Cherry Ripe Bites
 Cherry Ripe Sharepack
 Clinkers
 Crunchie Sharepack
 Dairy Milk Buttons
 Dairy Milk Freddo Faces
 Dairy Milk Freddo Sharepack
 Dairy Milk Giftbox
 Dairy Milk Marvellous Creations Jelly Popping Candy Beanies Sharepack
 Dairy Milk Sharepack
 Favourites
 Favourites Dairy Milk Mini Blocks 
 Flake Bites
 Flake Sharepack
 Lolly Bag
 Mallowbites Vanilla
 Milky Top Freddo Sharepack
 Milk Tray
 Party Mix
 Picnic Sharepack
 Roses
 Special Treats Sharepack
 Twirl Sharepack

Showbags

 Boost
 Caramello Koala
 Caramello Koala Superbag
 Cherry Ripe
 Crunchie
 Dairy Milk
 Dairy Milk Big Bite
 Dairy Milk Family Deal
 Dairy Milk Furry Friends
 Dairy Milk Marvellous Creations Family Deal
 Dairy Milk Marvellous Creations Superbag
 Dairy Milk Superbag
 Favourites
 Flake
 Freddo
 Freddo Family Deal
 Freddo Treats 
 Indulgence 
 Picnic
 Special Treats
 Twirl

Beverages
 Drinking Chocolate

Cooking

 Baking Dark Chocolate
 Baking Milk Chocolate
 Baking White Chocolate
 Baking Chips Dark Chocolate
 Baking Chips Milk Chocolate
 Baking Chips White Chocolate
 Bournville Cocoa
 Crunchie Sprinkler 
 Dark Flake Sprinkler 
 Melts Dark Chocolate
 Melts Milk Chocolate
 Melts White Chocolate

Biscuits

 Breakaway Dark Chocolate
 Breakaway Hazelnut
 Breakaway Milk Chocolate 
 Cookies Choc Centre
 Cookies Choc Chip
 Cookies Double Choc
 Fingers Milk Chocolate
 Fingers white Chocolate

Ice Creams

 Caramello Tub
 Cherry Ripe Tub
 Creamy Vanilla Flavour Tub
 Crunchie Ice Cream Bar
 Crunchie Ice Cream Cake
 Crunchie Tub
 Dairy Milk Black Forest Chocolate Flavour Tub
 Dairy Milk Caramello Chocolate Flavour Stick
 Dairy Milk Caramello Chocolate Flavour Tub
 Dairy Milk Chocolate Flavour Tub
 Dairy Milk Fruit & Nut Chocolate Flavour Tub
 Dairy Milk Hazelnut Chocolate Flavour Stick
 Dairy Milk Peppermint Chocolate Flavour Tub
 Dairy Milk Rocky Road Chocolate Flavour Tub
 Dairy Mik Salted Caramel Chocolate Flavour Tub
 Dairy Milk Top Deck Chocolate Flavour Stick
 Dairy Milk Top Deck Chocolate Flavour Tub
 Freddo Party Cake
 Picnic Tub

Christmas

 After Dinner Mints
 Chocolate covered Almonds
 Chocolate covered Fruit & Nut
 Chocolate covered Peanuts
 Chocolate covered Sultanas
 Christmas Eclairs
 Christmas Puddings
 Dairy Milk Advent Calendar
 Dairy Milk Caramello Santa
 Dairy Milk Caramello Santa Share Bag
 Dairy Milk Chocolate Sanatas Share Bag
 Dairy Milk Christmas Gift Tags
 Dairy Milk Make-A-Wish Gift Box
 Dairy Milk Marvellous Creations Star Gift Box
 Dairy Milk Marvellous Creations Stars
 Freddo Advent Calendar
 Freddo & Friends Gift Box
 Fudge Duets
 Little Wishes
 Little Wishes Share Bag
 Magical Elves
 Magical Elves Share Bag
 Make-A-Wish Advent Calendar
 Marshmallow Santa
 Marshmallow Santa Share Bag
 Novelties Mix
 Roses Christmas Tin
 Selections Bag
 Sharing Selection
 Stocking
 Variety Tube

Cadbury Australia Discontinued Products

Bars and Blocks

 Boost Max Caramel 
 Boost Max Caramel Twin Pack
 Boost Max Choc
 Boost Max Choc x2
 Boost Nuts
 Boost Stix
 Boost Toffee Crunch
 Boost Totally Nuts
 Brazil Nut
 Breakaway Dream
 Breakaway King Size
 Breakaway Share Pack
 Bubbly Dark
 Butter Chip
 Candy Nut
 Cashews 
 Cashew Nut
 Cherry Nut
 Cherry Ripe Burst
 Cherry Ripe Cherry Roll
 Cherry Ripe Dark Ganache 
 Cherry Ripe Double Dipped with 60% Cocoa 
 Cherry Ripe In A Block
 Chunky Dairy Milk
 Chunky Peppermint
 Chunky Top Deck
 Coconut Ice
 Coconut Rough
 Coco 70% Cocoa Raspberry
 Coco 70% Cocoa Salty Liquoce
 Coco 70% Cocoa Sea Salt & Pecan
 Coffee Walnut
 Connoisseur Coffee and Cream
 Connoisseur Grand Marnier Truffle 
 Connoisseur Praline 
 Crispello Double Choc
 Crispello Vanilla Velvet 
 Crisp-O Mint
 Dairy Milk Apple Crumble
 Dairy Milk Breakaway
 Dairy Milk Bubbly Honeycomb
 Dairy Milk Bubbly Strawberry
 Dairy Milk Bubbly White 
 Dairy Milk Cookies
 Dairy Milk Crackle
 Dairy Milk Desserts Boysenberry Shortcake
 Dairy Milk Desserts Fudge Brownie 
 Dairy Milk Desserts Lemon Cheesecake
 Dairy Milk Desserts Tiramisu
 Dairy Milk Desserts Crème Brulee
 Dairy Milk Golden Toffee
 Dairy Milk Green and Gold
 Dairy Milk Lamington
 Dairy Milk Marvellous Creations Banana Candy Peanut Drops Choc Biscuit 
 Dairy Milk Marvellous Creations Clinkers Gummi Bears Choc Biscuit
 Dairy Milk Marvellous Creations Cola Popping Candy Fizzy Crunch 
 Dairy Milk Marvellous Creations Jammy Doughnut
 Dairy Milk Marvellous Creations Max! Popping Candy, Fizz Lollies and Jelly
 Dairy Milk Marvellous Creations Orange Lolly Orange Chew Fizzy Crunch 
 Dairy Milk Marvellous Creations Peanut Toffee Cookie
 Dairy Milk Marvellous Creations Raspberry Lemonade
 Dairy Milk Marvellous Creations Toffee Apple Chew Toffee Apple Chip Crunchie Bits
 Dairy Milk Mega Crunchie
 Dairy Milk Mint Chip
 Dairy Milk Mousse Caramel
 Dairy Milk Mousse Chocolate 
 Dairy Milk Mousse Double Chocolate
 Dairy Milk Mousse Hazelnut
 Dairy Milk Mousse Raspberry Chocolate
 Dairy Milk Picnic In A Block
 Dairy Milk Pretzel & Peanut
 Dairy Milk Salted Caramel
 Dairy Milk Strawberries & Crème
 Dairy Milk Toffee Brittle
 Dairy Milk with Vegemite
 Dream Rainbow Balls & Popping Candy
 Dream with Oreo
 Flake Dipped
 Flake Luxury
 Flake Mint
 Flake Mocha 
 Flake Snow
 Finest Dark
 Freddo Crunchie
 Freddo Jelly Block
 Freddo Rainbow Chip
 Freddo Twins Pineapple
 Freddo 100s and 1000s
 Fruit & Nut Milk
 Ginger
 Gold Caramel 
 Grilled Almond Dark
 Guinea Gold
 Hazelnut Cream
 Honey Crisp
 Lite Milk
 Looney Tunes Family Block
 Milk Lunch
 Milk Punch
 Mini White Farm Friends
 Mocha-Orange Truffle
 Mr Big Picnic
 Nut Break 
 Nut Crunch
 Nut Milk
 Old Gold Liqueur Flavoured Selection
 Old Gold Toffee Crunch
 Peanut Bar
 Picnic Cookie Crunch
 Picnic Frugly
 Picnic Fruit & Nut
 Picnic Hedgehog
 Picnic Honeycomb
 Picnic Honey Almond Nougat 
 Picnic Roast Almond Feast
 Picnic Rocky Road
 Pocket Pack Caramello 
 Pocket Pack Fruit & Nut
 Pocket Pack Peppermint
 Scorched Almond 
 Snack Strawberries & Cream
 Story Block
 Strawberry 
 Sultana
 Summer Fruits 
 Swiss Chalet
 Toffee Nut
 Toffee Regal
 Twirl Caramel
 Twirl Mint
 Twirl Orange 
 White

Bags, Boxes and Rolls

 Crispello Double Choc
 Crispello Vanilla Velvet 
 Crunchie Rocks
 Dairy Milk Caramello Nibbles
 Dairy Milk Caramello Roll
 Dairy Milk Marvellous Creations Caramel Shakes
 Dairy Milk Marvellous Creations Jelly Zingers
 Dairy Milk Marvellous Creations Toffee Nutters
 Dairy Milk Peppermint Roll
 Dairy Milk Roll
 Mini Drops
 Scotch Terrier Assortment

Biscuits

 Breakaway Honeycomb
 Crunchie Biscuits
 Dairy Milk Biscuits
 Fingers Honeycomb
 Freddo Chocolate Biscuits
 Freddo Chocolate Snack Pack
 Freddo Vanilla Biscuits
 Freddo Vanilla Snack Pack 
 Mini Fingers Honeycomb
 Mini Fingers Milk Chocolate

Ice Creams

 Dairy Milk Marvellous Ice Cream Banana Candy, Bubblegum and Fudge Cookie
 Dairy Milk Marvellous Ice Cream Choc-Honeycomb Cookie
 Dairy Milk Marvellous Ice Cream Jelly Popping Candy Beanies

Cadbury New Zealand

Bars and Blocks

 Brunch Hazelnut
 Brunch Mixed Berry
 Brunch Peanut
 Brunch Toasted Coconut
 Buzz
 Caramel Chew
 Cherry Ripe
 Chocolate Fish
 Crunchie
 Crunchie Kingsize
 Curly Wurly
 Dairy Milk Black Forest
 Dairy Milk Caramello
 Dairy Milk Chocolate Bubbly
 Dairy Milk Coconut Rough
 Dairy Milk Dark Bubbly 
 Dairy Milk Freddo
 Dairy Milk Fruit & Nut
 Dairy Milk Hazelnut
 Dairy Milk Jaffas
 Dairy Milk Marvellous Creations Jelly Crunchie Bits
 Dairy Milk Marvellous Creations Jelly Popping Candy Beanies 
 Dairy Milk Mint Bubbly
 Dairy Milk Picnic
 Dairy Milk Roast Almond 
 Dairy Milk Rocky Road
 Dairy Milk Snack
 Dairy Milk Top Deck
 Dairy Milk Turkish Delight 
 Dairy Milk White Bubbly
 Dairy Milk with Crunchie
 Dream
 Energy
 Flake
 Flake Luxury
 Mighty Perky Nana
 Moro
 Moro Twin Pack
 Moro Gold
 Moro Gold Twin Pack
 Old Gold 70% Cocoa
 Old Gold Old Jamaica Rum 'N' Raisin 
 Old Gold Original
 Old Gold Peppermint
 Old Gold Roast Almond
 Perky Nana
 Picnic
 Picnic Twin Pack
 Pinky
 Time Out
 Twirl

Bags and Boxes

 After Dinner Mints
 Caramels
 Chocolate Fish 6 Pack
 Continental Old Gold
 Crunchie Sharepack
 Dairy Milk Buttons
 Dairy Milk Sharepack
 Favourites
 Flake Sharpack
 Freddo Dairy Milk Sharpack
 Freddo Milky Top Sharepack
 Jaffas
 Milk Tray
 Mini Drops
 Moro Gold Sharepack
 Moro Sharepack
 Old Gold Almonds
 Perky Nana Sharepack
 Pinky Sharepack
 Roses
 Scorched Almonds

Beverages

 Drinking Chocolate
 Drinking Chocolate Caramel Flavour
 Drinking Chocolate Mint Flavour

Cooking

Baking Dark Chocolate
Baking Milk Chocolate
Baking White Chocolate
Baking Chips Dark Chocolate
Baking Chips Milk Chocolate
Baking Chips White Chocolate
Bournville Cocoa
Melts Dark Chocolate
Melts Milk Chocolate
Melts White Chocolate

Cadbury New Zealand Discontinued Products

Bars and Blocks

 Aztec
 Banana Shake 
 Black Forest Chunky
 Caramello Kiwi
 Charlie Brown Bar 
 Coconice
 Coconut Delight
 Coconut Royal
 Countrystyle
 Choc-A-Nut
 Crunch
 Cruson 
 Curly Wurly Banana 
 Dairy Milk Apple Crumble
 Dairy Milk Bonkers 4 Berry
 Dairy Milk Crackle 
 Dairy Milk Craving 4 Coffee
 Dairy Milk Crazy 4 Caramel
 Dairy Milk Lamington
 Dairy Milk Mad 4 Mint
 Dairy Milk Marvellous Creations Cola Popping Candy Fizzy Crunch 
 Dairy Milk Marvellous Creations Orange Lolly Orange Chew Fizzy Crunch 
 Dairy Milk Marvellous Creations Peanut Toffee Cookie
 Dairy Milk Marvellous Creations Toffee Apple Chew Toffee Apple Chip Crunchie Bits
 Dairy Milk Mousse Chocolate
 Dairy Milk Mousse Double Chocolate
 Dairy Milk Pretzel & Peanut 
 Dairy Milk Raspberry Chocolate
 Dairy Milk Raspberry & Lemonade 
 Dairy Milk Salted Caramel 
 Dairy Milk with Jaffas 
 Double Choc Hit
 Energy Chunky
 English Toffee Truffle
 Farm Animals 
 Farm Friends
 Fruit Crunch 
 Goldie Bar
 Guinea Gold
 Happy Times 
 Honeycomb 
 Honey Nougat 
 Honeycomb Sandwich
 Jelly Choc Chip
 Jurassic Park Bar
 King Size Plus Crunch 
 King Size Plus Double Chocolate 
 Kool Bananas 
 Kool Cola
 Kool Krunch
 Looney Tunes Bar
 Lunas Bar
 Luxury Flake
 Milky White 
 Mini White Farm Animals 
 Mint Crunchie
 Monster Bar
 Moro Almond 
 Moro Energy Max
 Moro Gold Max Caramel
 Moro Gold Max Caramel Twin Pack 
 Moro Gold Stix
 Moro Gold Totally Nuts 
 Neopolitan 
 Nudge
 Nut Milk
 Nutty Bar
 Ooze Bar
 Orange Truffle
 Pinepple Milk Chocolate
 Raisin 
 Rocky Road Chunky
 Rum and Butter
 Snoopy Bar
 Snowflake 
 Story Block
 Sunny
 Swing
 Take 5
 Tempo
 Test Players
 The Simpsons Bar
 The Wombles Bar
 The Young Indiana Jones Chronicles Bar
 Toastie 
 Trigger
 Viking with Guarana 
 Whip
 White Top
 Wobbly 
 Wriggler
 Y2K

Bags, Boxes and Rolls

 Choc Shocks 
 Dairy Milk Bubbly Sharepack
 D.M.C's
 Dairy Milk Croquettes Roll
 Fudge Duets
 Footys
 Jax
 Pebbles
 Scorched Almonds  
 Snowballs

Beverages
 Bournvita

Biscuits

 Fingers Chocolate
 Fingers Honeycomb
 Fingers Milk Chocolate
 Freddo Chocolate Biscuits
 Freddo Vanilla Biscuits

Miscellaneous
 Chippies Salt & Vinegar Potato Chips

Cadbury Canada

Bars and Blocks 

 Burnt Almond Dark
 Caramilk
 Caramilk Bar & A Half
 Caramilk Dark
 Caramilk Thick
 Cerises
 Crispy Crunch
 Crispy Crunch x2
 Crunchie
 Crunchie x2
 Dairy Milk
 Dairy Milk Almond
 Dairy Milk Bubbly
 Dairy Milk Bubbly Mint
 Dairy Milk Bubbly White
 Dairy Milk Caramel Popcorn	
 Dairy Milk Chips Ahoy! Cookie Dough
 Dairy Milk Coconut Cashew
 Dairy Milk Fruit & Nut
 Dairy Milk Hazelnut
 Dairy Milk Marvellous Creations Banana Caramel Crisp
 Dairy Milk Marvellous Creations Cookie Nut Crunch
 Dairy Milk Marvellous Creations Jelly Popping Candy
 Dairy Milk Mint
 Dairy Milk Mixed Nuts
 Dairy Milk Orange
 Dairy Milk Oreo Cookie Crunch
 Dairy Milk Pretzel & Peanut Butter
 Dairy Milk Salty Caramelized Peanut
 Dairy Milk Sweet & Salty Peanut
 Dairy Milk Toffee
 Dark Milk Crunchy Salted Caramel Pieces 
 Dark Milk Roasted & Caramelized Hazelnut
 Flake
 Fruit & Nut Dark
 Jersey Milk
 Malted Milk
 Mr. Big
 Mr. Big x2
 Premium Dark
 Wunderbar
 Wunderbar x2

Bags and Boxes

 Caramilk Juniors
 Caramilk Minis
 Caramilk Secrets 
 Clusters
 Crispy Crunch Minis
 Crunchie Clusters
 Crunchums
 Dairy Milk Buttons
 Dairy Milk Marvellous Mixes with Maynard's
 Dairy Milk Marvellous Mixes with Oreo
 Dairy Milk Marvellous Mixes with Ritz
 Mini Eggs
 Mr. Big Minis
 Juniors
 Peanuts
 Popped
 Raisins 
 Toffee Clusters
 Wunderbar Minis

Biscuits 

 Caramel Biscuits
 Crunchie Biscuits
 Cream Egg Biscuits
 Digestives 
 Fingers
 Fingers Dark 
 Mini Fingers
 Mini Fingers Toffee
 Indulgent

Desserts 

 Dairy Milk Cake
 Caramilk Cake
 Caramilk Fondue

Beverages 

 Caramilk Chocolate Shake
 Caramilk Cream Coolers 
 Caramilk Cream Liqueur

Easter

 Caramilk Egg
 Creme Egg
 Dairy Milk Buttons Chick
 L'il Scoops Chocolatey
 L'il Scoops Vanilla
 Mini Assorted Eggs
 Mini Caramilk Eggs
 Mini Caramilk Eggs Tube
 Mini Creme Eggs
 Mini Creme Eggs Tube
 Mini Easter Eggs
 Mini Eggs
 Mini Eggs Family Pack
 Mini Eggs Pouch
 Mini Eggs Tube

Cadbury Canada Discontinued Products

Bars and Blocks

 Almonds
 Almond & Raisin
 Amazon Brittle
 Astros
 Bar Six
 Brazil Nut
 Cappuccino 
 Caramilk Choc-o-Men
 Caramilk Coffee
 Caramilk Fudge
 Caramilk Maple
 Caramilk Secrets
 Coconut
 Coffee
 Crisps & Honey
 Crunch 
 Crunchie Crush Orange
 Dairy Milk Bunnies
 Dairy Milk Coconut & Cashews 
 Dairy Milk Honey Roasted Cashews & Hazelnuts
 Dairy Milk Peanut Butter
 Dairy Milk Salty Caramelised Peanut
 Dairy Milk Thins 
 Dairy Milk Thins Mint Chip
 Dairy Milk Thins Toffee
 Extra
 Finest Dark
 Fusion
 Golden Crisp
 Honeycrisp 
 Ice Breaker
 Macaroon
 Malted Milk
 Milk Tray Chocolate 
 Mr. Big Double Dunk
 Nut Milk
 Pep
 Peppermint
 Raspberry 
 Rum & Butter
 Semi-Sweet
 Snack Bar
 Sweet Marie
 Thick Hazel Nut
 Time Out
 Vanilla Creme
 Yogurt

Cadbury North America

Bars and Blocks

 Caramello
 Caramello King Size
 Dairy Milk
 Dairy Milk Caramello 
 Dairy Milk English Toffee
 Dairy Milk Fruit & Nut
 Dairy Milk Roast Almond
 Royal Dark Creamy Mint
 Royal Dark Dark Chocolate
 Royal Dark Salted Caramel

Bags and Boxes
 Mini Eggs

All Season Eggs
 Caramel Egg
 Chocolate Egg
 Creme Egg

Cadbury North America Discontinued Products

Bars and Blocks

 Almond 
 Brazil Nut
 Choice 
 Coconut
 Curly Wurly 
 Hazel Nut
 Krisp
 Mint
 Starbar
 Thick Roast Almond
 Thick Dairy Milk

Cadbury India

Bars and Blocks

 5 Star
 5 Star 3D 30/-
 5 Star Chomp
 5 Star Crunchy 
 5 Star Fruit & Nut
 Bournville Almond 
 Bournville Hazelnut
 Bournville Raisin & Nut 
 Bournville Rich Cocoa
 Bournville Cranberry
 Dairy Milk 
 Dairy Milk Crackle 
 Dairy Milk Fruit & Nut 
 Dairy Milk Black Forest
 Dairy Milk Marvellous Creations Jelly Popping Candy
 Dairy Milk Oreo
 Dairy Milk Roast Almond
 Dairy Milk Tropical Mango 
 Dairy Milk Silk 
 Dairy Milk Silk Bubbly 
 Dairy Milk Silk Fruit & Nut 
 Dairy Milk Silk Roast Almond
 Dairy Milk Silk Caramello
 Dairy milk silk mocha caramello
Cadbury brownie mix
 Dairy Milk Silk Hazelnut
 Dairy Milk Silk Oreo
 Dairy Milk Silk Red Velvet Oreo
 Dairy Milk Honey Crunch
 Dairy Milk Butterscotch Crunch
 Dairy Milk Coffee Almond 
Dairy Milk Crispello
 Fuse
 Perk 
 Perk with Glucose Energy
 Temptations Almond Treat
 Temptations Cashew Appeal
 Temptations Orange Almond
 Temptations Raisin Apricot 
 Temptations Rum Raisins
 Cadbury Chocobix
 Madbury Chilli ﹰOrange
 Madbury Gulab-e-Khaas
 Madbury Crispy Rabdi
 Madbury Crunchy Cola

Bags and Boxes

 Nutties 
 Celebrations 
 Celebrations Almond Magic
 Celebrations Favourites
 Celebrations Mini 
 Celebrations Raisin Magic
 Celebrations Rich Dry Fruit
 Choclairs
 Choclairs Gold
 Choclairs Rich Brownie
 Dairy Milk Home Treats
 Gems
 Glow
 Monster Gems
 Perk Home Treats
 5 Star Home Treats
 Dairy Milk Shots
 Dairy Milk Shots with Friends 
 Silk Pralines 
 Silk Miniatures Gift Box
 Shots

Beverages

 Bournvita
 Bournvita 5 Star Magic
 Bournvita l'il Champs
 Bournvita women
 Choc-o-Cheer

Miscellaneous
 Dairy Milk Lickables

Cadbury India Discontinued Products

Bars, Blocks, Bags and Boxes 

 Bournville Fruit & Nut
 Chocki Stick Chocolates
 Chocki Stick Mango
 Chocki Stick Strawberry
 Chocki Stick Vanilla
 Dairy Milk Butterscotch Crunch
 Dairy Milk Cashew & Coconut
 Dairy Milk Silk Orange Peel
 Dairy Milk Wowie 
 Milk Treat
 Milk Treat Creamy 
 Orange Delite 
 Relish 
 Temptations Black Forest
 Temptations Cashew Delite 
 Temptations Honey Apricot
 Temptations Mint Crunch 
 Temptations Old Jamaica 
 Temptations Roast Almond Coffee
 Tiffins
 Cadbury Bytes

Cadbury Pakistan

Bars and Blocks

 Dairy Milk
 Dairy Milk Bubbly
 Dairy Milk Crackle
 Dairy Milk Fruit & Nut
 Dairy Milk Roast Almond
 Dairy Milk Marvelous Creation
 Perk

Cadbury Nigeria

Beverages

 Bournvita
 Hot Chocolate 3in1

Cadbury Kenya Discontinued Products

Bars and Blocks 

 Fruit & Biscuit Crunch
 Grand Seville 
 Milk Chocolate Crunch
 Nut Crunch
 Old Jamaica
 Supa Snack Orange
 Fugde
 Mint choc

Cadbury Malaysia

Bars and Blocks 

 Dairy Milk
 Dairy Milk Black Forest
 Dairy Milk Cashew Nuts
 Dairy Milk Chocolate Mousse
 Dairy Milk French Vanilla
 Dairy Milk Fruit & Nut
 Dairy Milk Hazel Nut
 Dairy Milk Hazelnut Praline
 Dairy Milk Honeycomb & Nuts
 Dairy Milk Marvellous Creations Jelly Popping Candy
 Dairy Milk Marvellous Creations Peanut Toffee Cookie 
 Dairy Milk Mixed Nuts
 Dairy Milk Oreo
 Dairy Milk Roast Almond 
 Dairy Milk Strawberry
 Dairy Milk Blueberry
 Dairy Milk Chocolate Mousse
 Zip Chocolate Flavour
 Zip Hazel Nut Flavour
 Zip Orange Flavour
 Zip Strawberry Flavour 
 Zip Vanilla Flavour
 5 Star
 Crunchie
 Boost
 Picnic
 Cadbury bubble

Bags and Boxes

 Choclairs Blueberry 
 Choclairs Hazelnut
 Choclairs Original
 Choclairs Raisin Rush
 Dairy Milk Fruit & Nuts
 Dairy Milk Mixed Nuts

Biscuits
 Fingers

Cadbury Russia

Bars and Blocks 

 Big Picnic Peanut x2
 Compliment Milk Chocolate
 Compliment with Peanuts and Cornflakes
 Compliment with Peanuts and Raisins 
 Creamy Milk
 Dairy Milk
 Fruit & Nut
 Hazel Nut
 Picnic Mega Walnut
 Picnic Peanut
 Picnic Walnut
 Roast Almond
 Tempo
 Tempo Mega

Bags and Boxes
 Selection

Cadbury Argentina

Bars and Blocks

 Almendras
 Dairy Milk 
 Intense
 Pasas
 Tres Sueños
 Yoghurt Frutilla

Ice Creams

Crema Helada Tentación con Almendras
Crema Helada Tentación con Yogur de Frutilla

Cadbury Germany

Bars and Blocks 
 Wunderbar
 Curly Wurly

Cadbury Germany Discontinued Products

Bars and Blocks 

 Bournville 
 Milk Chocolate
 Milk Chocolate Mocha

Cadbury France

Biscuits

 Fingers L'Original 
 Fingers Toffee
 Mini Finger Pocket 
 Mini Z'Animo
 Mini Z'Animo Pocket

Cadbury France Discontinued Products

Bars and Blocks 

 Milk Chocolate
 Milk Chocolate with Rum and Raisin
 Milk Chocolate with Wholenuts

Cadbury Spain Discontinued Products

Bars and Blocks 

 Huesitos Leche
 Huesitos Leche x2
 Huesitos Original
 Huesitos Original x2
 Milk Tray Block
 Tokke
 Tokke 3 Pack

Bags and Boxes
 Huesitos Balls
 Huesitos Mini

Multipacks
 Huesitos Original 6 Pack
 Huesitos Original 10 Pack

Cadbury Poland Discontinued Products

Bars and Blocks 

 Allye
 Dairy Milk
 King
 Picnic
 Samba Nougat

Cadbury Egypt

Bars and Blocks 

 5 Star
 Chixo
 Chixo Hazelnut
 Dairy Milk
 Dairy Milk Bubbly
 Dairy Milk Bubbly Oreo
 Dairy Milk Caramello
 Dairy Milk Crispello
 Dairy Milk Fruit & Nut
 Dairy Milk Hazelnut
 Dairy Milk Marvellous Creations Jelly Popping Candy
 Dairy Milk Oreo Cookie Covered With Chocolate
 Dairy Milk Oreo: Chocolate With Vanilla And Orea Cookie Pieces
 Dipped Flake
 Mandolin
 Pour Lyly: ta réponse sera sur Viber.
 Mandolin x2
 Moro
 Moro Coffee

Biscuits
Double Chocolate Delight.

Beverages
Hot Cocoa

Ice Creams
Dairy Milk Ice Cream Stick
Dairy Milk Ice Cream Cone

Cadbury Egypt Discontinued Products

Bars and Blocks 
 Dairy Milk Marvellous Creations Cookie Gummy Crunch

References

Cadbury products

Cadbury